The Fédération française aéronautique (FFA), (Fédération nationale aéronautique, FNA, before 2004) founded in 1929 and being recognized as a public service in 1933, is a French association which represents the majority of aeroclubs.

Its mission is:
 Assist and defend aeroclubs
 Preserve the number and quality of French aerodromes
 Develop and ease recognition of aeronautics
 Ease the formation of pilots in aeroclubs
 Help the youngest and evangelise aeronautics activities
 Contribute, as interlocutor of the Direction Générale de l'Aviation Civile, to enact the regulations and defend interests of private pilots
 Organise activities and aeronautics tests in France and abroad (attribution of regional or national titles, selection of French representatives at internationals competitions or exhibitions)

As of 2007, the FFA includes about 600 aeroclubs over 450 aerodromes, 42,000 pilots, 2,200 instructors and 2,200 aircraft.

See also 

 Fédération française de parachutisme

External links
  FFA website
  French Private Pilots Forum

Flying clubs
Transport organizations based in France